The Concordia Mill is a former gristmill on Cedar Creek located in Hamilton, Wisconsin, United States. The limestone mill was built in 1853 by Edward H. Janssen and his brother, Theodore, along with a Mr. Gaitsch with locally quarried limestone. In 1881, the mill's dam washed out during heavy spring flooding and was rebuilt sometime later. The mill operated until World War II when it was converted into a distillery that operated for several years. On April 26, 1974, it was added to the National Register of Historic Places, and the surrounding area, known as the Hamilton Historic District was added to the NRHP two years later.

From the 1950s through the early 1970s, the City of Cedarburg's sewers carried waste oil containing PCBs from the local Mercury Marine plant to the Cedarburg Mill's pond, upstream of Concordia Mill. The contamination also spread downstream to Concordia Mill's pond, where it settled into the sediment. In 1986, PCBs were found in the millpond's fish. In 1994 Cedar Creek became an EPA Superfund site, and in 1996 the mill's dam washed out, washing contaminated sediment downstream and complicating the cleanup of Cedar Creek.

See also

References

Grinding mills on the National Register of Historic Places in Wisconsin
Buildings and structures in Ozaukee County, Wisconsin
Limestone buildings in the United States
Industrial buildings completed in 1853
Grinding mills in Wisconsin
National Register of Historic Places in Ozaukee County, Wisconsin
Removed dams in Wisconsin